The 1894 Ohio Green and White football team was an American football team that represented Ohio University as an independent during the 1894 college football season. In its first season of intercollegiate football, Ohio compiled a 0–1 record. The university organized its first football team in 1892, but did not play any games until its 1894 match with Marietta.

Schedule

References

Ohio
Ohio Bobcats football seasons
Ohio Green and White football